The Bungle Bungle Ranges gehyra (Gehyra ipsa)  is a species of gecko in the genus Gehyra, endemic to Western Australia.

References

Gehyra
Reptiles described in 2005
Geckos of Australia
Endemic fauna of Australia